Mabaso is a South African surname that may refer to
Abel Mabaso (born 1991), South African association football defender
Brenda Lindiwe Mabaso-Chipeio (born 1969), South African international trade expert
Mduduzi Mabaso (born 1976), South African actor
Themba Mabaso, director of South Africa Bureau of Heraldry

Bantu-language surnames